Plaaz is a municipality  in the Rostock district, in Mecklenburg-Vorpommern, Germany.
It is situated close to the cities Güstrow, Laage and Teterow.
Plaaz includes several villages such as Mierendorf, Wendorf and Zapkendorf. As of January 2005, both Spoitgendorf and Recknitz are incorporated in this municipality.

References